Carlton Usher (born 19 December 1968) is a Belizean sprinter. He competed in the men's 400 metres at the 1988 Summer Olympics.

References

1968 births
Living people
Athletes (track and field) at the 1988 Summer Olympics
Athletes (track and field) at the 1991 Pan American Games
Belizean male sprinters
Olympic athletes of Belize
Place of birth missing (living people)
Pan American Games competitors for Belize